G C Anupama was the former Dean and Senior Professor (retired), Indian Institute of Astrophysics (IIA) in Bengaluru. She served (for the period of 2019-2022) as president of the Astronomical Society of India (ASI), becoming the first woman to head this association of professional astronomers in India. Anupama is a member of the Indian core team which is part of the international effort to establish the thirty meter telescope (TMT) in Hawaii, USA. Anupama was also the principal investigator of the project which led to the establishment of the 0.7m wide field telescope at Hanle near Leh in Ladakh, the world's ninth highest site for optical, infrared and gamma-ray telescopes in the world. 

Anupama has published articles in the field of astronomy, with a focus on the initial physical conditions after a Supernova. She has also been the editor of the Journal of the ASI. She is studying ‘transients’ — objects that brighten up for a brief period of time before going dark in space.

Awards and recognition
Anupama has received the Sir CV Raman Young Scientist Award in 2001 and is a fellow of the Indian National Science Academy,  the National Academy of Sciences India and the Indian Academy of Sciences. She completed her PhD in 1991 from IIA and had been a faculty member at the institute since 1995.

References

External links
IIA Website on G C Anupama
G C Anupama on Research Gate 

Indian scientists
Indian astronomers
Year of birth missing (living people)
Living people